Michael Lockshin (born 1981) is a Russian-American film director.

Biography

Lockshin was born in 1981 in the USA. He grew up in both the US and Russia.

Lockshin graduated with a MA degree in Psychology from Moscow States University. While still studying he started working in film, and soon began directing commercials and music videos. His commercial works won him numerous awards, including Cannes Lions Young Director's Awards, Golden Drum, and others. The David Duchovny beer ad (2014) went viral internationally.   

Lockshin's debut feature film, Silver Skates, was released theatrically Christmas 2020 in Russia to high acclaim. The movie became the first Russian-language movie to be acquired as a Netflix Originals. It premiered as the Opening Film of the Moscow International Film Festival. At the 20th Golden Eagle Awards (2021), Silver Skates was nominated for 12 awards, a record in the history of the Golden Eagle Awards, and won 6 awards, most notably "Best Picture". Lockshin himself was nominated for Best Director. The film was also nominated for and won several awards at the Nika Awards in 2021, with Lockshin being nominated for "Discovery of the Year".

His second feature film Woland, based on Mikhail Bulgakov's cult novel The Master and Margarita, which he also co-wrote stars German actor August Diehl. The film was shot in 2021 and was to be released  by Universal Pictures in Dec 2022, but because of Russia's invasion into Ukraine, the release date was pushed to end of 2023.  

He is the son of Arnold Lockshin, a scientist who moved to the USSR. According to Business Insider, Michael is not a Russian citizen.

References 

21st-century Russian screenwriters
Male screenwriters
Russian film directors

1981 births
Living people
American emigrants to the Soviet Union